Parmulariopsella is a genus of fungi in the family Parmulariaceae. A monotypic genus, it contains the single species Parmulariopsella burseracearum.

References

External links
Index Fungorum

Parmulariaceae
Monotypic Dothideomycetes genera